The 1991 Baylor Bears football team (variously "Baylor", "BU", or the "Bears") represented Baylor University in the 1991 NCAA Division I-A football season. They were represented in the Southwest Conference. They played their home games at Floyd Casey Stadium in Waco, Texas. They were coached by head coach Grant Teaff.

Schedule

Roster

References

Baylor
Baylor Bears football seasons
Baylor Bears football